Moka  is a 2016 Franco-Swiss psychological thriller drama film written and directed by Frédéric Mermoud and based on the novel of the same name by Tatiana de Rosnay. The film was shown in the Piazza Grande section of the 2016 Locarno International Film Festival. It stars Emmanuelle Devos and Nathalie Baye.

Cast 
 Emmanuelle Devos as Diane Kramer
 Nathalie Baye as Marlène
 David Clavel as Michel
 Diane Rouxel as Élodie
 Samuel Labarthe as Simon
 Olivier Chantreau as Vincent
 Jean-Philippe Écoffey as private investigator
 Marion Reymond as Adrienne
 Paulin Jaccoud as Luc

Production
Filming began on location in Haute-Savoie on 8 September 2015 and continued in the surrounding areas of Lake Geneva. The shooting was completed on 24 October.

Accolades

References

External links 
 

2016 films
2016 psychological thriller films
2010s psychological drama films
2010s French-language films
French psychological thriller films
French psychological drama films
Swiss thriller films
Swiss drama films
Films based on French novels
2016 drama films
French-language Swiss films
2010s French films